Novameat is a food tech startup that works with plant-based foods, including plant-based meat substitutes. According to El País, the company was responsible in 2018 for creating a meat substitute through 3D printing, whereby a plant-based paste was used with syringes placed in a 3D printer using AutoCAD software.

History 
Novameat was founded in 2018 by Giuseppe Scionti, a bioengineering researcher and entrepreneur. In September 2019, the company announced it had received funding from New Crop Capital, a private venture fund that has also invested in Beyond Meat, Memphis Meats, SuperMeat, Mosa Meat, Good Catch, Kite Hill and Zero Egg, among other companies developing plant-based and cell-based products. Also in 2019, Novameat was included in Peter Diamandis' article "The 5 Big Breakthroughs to Anticipate in 3D Printing".

Approach
Novameat intents to provide the machinery to make the plant-based meat under a licensing agreement to other companies.
 Novameat uses 3D printing to produce meat substitutes made from plants.The company utilizes pea protein, beetroot juice, and other plant-based elements to create its 3D- printed steak. With industrial machinery, Novameat can produce 500 kg of plant-based whole cuts per hour. With only plant-based elements, Novameat aims to recreate the muscle fibers of animal meat.

References

External links 
 Official website

Vegetarian companies and establishments
Companies based in Barcelona
Spanish companies established in 2018
Food and drink companies established in 2018